Sycacantha pararufata is a moth of the family Tortricidae. It is found in Vietnam.

The wingspan is about 24.5 mm. The ground colour of the forewings is pale brownish rust densely dotted and finely strigulated (finely streaked) with brown. The distal third of the costa is paler and tinged pinkish.

Etymology
The name refers to similarity with Phaecasiophora rufata.

References

Moths described in 2009
Olethreutini
Sycacantha
Moths of Asia
Taxa named by Józef Razowski